MACS J0416.1-2403 is a cluster of galaxies at a redshift of z=0.397 with a mass 160 trillion times the mass of the Sun inside . The system was discovered in images taken by the Hubble Space Telescope during the Massive Cluster Survey, MACS. This cluster causes gravitational lensing of distant galaxies producing multiple images. Based on the distribution of the multiple image copies, scientists have been able to deduce and map the distribution of dark matter. The images, released in 2014, were used in the Cluster Lensing And Supernova survey with Hubble (CLASH) to help scientists peer back in time at the early Universe and to discover the distribution of dark matter.

Gallery

References

Dark matter
Galaxy clusters
Eridanus (constellation)